Gunbarlang, or Kunbarlang, is an Australian Aboriginal language in northern Australia with multiple dialects. Other names are Gungalang and Warlang. Speakers are multilingual in Kunwinjku and Mawng. Most of the Gunbarlang people now speak Kunwinjku.

The language is part of a language revival project, as a critically endangered language.

Classification
Gunbarlang has been proposed to be included into the marne group of Gunwinyguan family, making its closest relatives the Central Gunwinyguan languages Bininj Kunwok and Dalabon. The label marne refers to the phonological shape of the benefactive applicative affix common to all three languages (as opposed to the bak languages to the east, e.g. Rembarrnga, Ngandi and Wubuy/Nunggubuyu).

Geographic distribution
Some Gunbarlang speakers live in Warruwi on South Goulburn Island and Maningrida. Historically, it was also spoken in Gunbalanya.

Grammar
Gunbarlang is a polysynthetic language with complex verb morphology. It includes polypersonal agreement, incorporation, and a number of derivational affixes. Word order in a (transitive) clause is SVO or SOV.

Morphosyntax
Morphology is primarily agglutinating. Verbal morphology (rather than case marking or syntax) encodes a significant part of grammatical relations.

Verbal
The verb includes obligatory agreement with its core arguments in the form of bound pronouns. The subject/agent prefix precedes the object prefix. Subject prefixes form four mood series: positive indicative, "non-performative", future/intentional, and potential.

The verb features derivational affixes, such as benefactive, directional, and TAM.

Nominal
Case in not marked on nouns and free pronouns, but bound pronouns follow nominative-accusative alignment.

Gunbarlang distinguishes five noun classes on demonstratives (M, F, plants, body-parts, and inanimate), but only four on other constituents (collapsing the latter two).

Language revival

, Kunbarlang is one of 20 languages prioritised as part of the Priority Languages Support Project, being undertaken by First Languages Australia and funded by the Department of Communications and the Arts. The project aims to "identify and document critically-endangered languages — those languages for which little or no documentation exists, where no recordings have previously been made, but where there are living speakers".

Notes

References
 
 
 
 

Gunwinyguan languages
Arnhem Land
Indigenous Australian languages in the Northern Territory
Extinct languages of the Northern Territory